Cottered is a village and civil parish  west of Buntingford and  east of Baldock in the East Hertfordshire District of Hertfordshire in England.  It had a population of 634 in 2001, increasing to 659 at the 2011 Census.

Cottered is home to a Japanese garden designed in the early 20th century by Herbert Goode, at the Garden House. It is listed Grade II* on the Register of Historic Parks and Gardens.

North of Cottered, on a private drive off Throcking Road, is Broadfield House. This was rebuilt for Lady Hester Ley, daughter of the Earl of Marlborough, who married into the local Pulter family. Her daughter Margaret married John Forrester: their son James (d.1696) had Broadfield Hall extended, with stables designed by Nicholas Hawksmoor which are now Grade II listed.

Among those who have held the living of Cottered may be mentioned the Rev Anthony Trollope, who was grandfather of the authors Anthony Trollope and Thomas Adolphus Trollope. He was incumbent of Cottered for forty-four years and died in 1806.

Cottered also has a blue plaque to the first president of the Republic of China Sun Yat-sen, who stayed at The Kennels, country home of James Cantlie.

It has a football club, Cottered FC.

A Manor House built in the 1400s, said to be the "oldest inhabited house in Hertfordshire", stands in Cottered. "The Lordship" is a Grade I listed building. The summary states: "Early-mid C15 (probably for John Fray who held the manor 1428-1461...), altered in early C17 ... chimney dated 1699, later modernizations ...". According to a 2021 report in Country Life, the property was owned by Gwilym Lloyd George in the 1950s. The subsequent owners maintained the house well, but it was due for "some gentle updating".

References

External links
 Cottered Parish Council
 Hertfordshire Genealogy: Places: Cottered
 A Vision of Britain

Civil parishes in Hertfordshire
Villages in Hertfordshire
East Hertfordshire District